Minuscule 339 (in the Gregory-Aland numbering), δ 303 (Soden), is a Greek minuscule manuscript of the New Testament, on parchment. Paleographically it has been assigned to the 13th century. 
It has marginalia.

Description 

The codex originally contained a complete text of the New Testament on 200 parchment leaves. It was written in two columns per page, in 56-58 lines per page. It was written by three different hands. However, it was mostly destroyed by fire at the Turin library in 1904, and only charred fragments remain.

There is also a division according to the smaller Ammonian Sections (in Mark 237 – last in 16:15), whose numbers are given at the margin with references to the Eusebian Canons (written below Ammonian Section numbers).

The order of book is typical for major Greek manuscripts: Gospels, Acts, Catholic epistles, Pauline epistles, Book of Revelation, but this order is not original.

It contains the Book of Psalms, Epistle of Pilatus with response, Genealogy of Maria.

According to the subscription at the end of the Epistle to the Romans, the Letter was written προς Ρωμαιους εγραφη απο Κορινθου δια Φοιβης της διακονου; the same subscription have manuscripts: 42, 90, 216, 462, 466, 642;

Text 

Kurt Aland the Greek text of the codex did not place in any Category.
It was not examined by the Claremont Profile Method.

History 

The manuscript was examined by Pasino, Scholz, and Burgon. It was added to the list of New Testament manuscripts by Scholz (1794-1852).
C. R. Gregory saw it in 1886.

The manuscript is currently housed at the Turin National University Library (B. V. 8) in Turin.

See also 

 List of New Testament minuscules
 Biblical manuscript
 Textual criticism

References

Further reading 

 Giuseppe Passino, Codices manuscripti Bibliothaece Regii Taurini Athenaei, Turin 1742, vol. 2. 
 G. de Sanctis, Rivista di Filologiae d'Instruzione Classica 32 (1904), 584.

Greek New Testament minuscules
13th-century biblical manuscripts